is the 2009 sequel and third installment of the Japanese anime television series Shugo Chara!. Following directly after Shugo Chara!! Doki—, it aired as part of Shugo Chara! Party!. This third installment introduces a new anime-only character, Rikka Hiiragi, a transfer student who can understand X Eggs. The opening theme for the Shugo Chara!!! Dokki Doki segment is "Watashi no Tamago" (lit. My Egg) performed by Shugo Chara Egg!, while the opening for Shugo Chara Party! itself is "Party Time" by Guardians 4. The first ending is "Bravo! Bravo!" performed by Buono!. The second opening for Shugo Chara!!! Dokki Doki is "Arigatou ~Ookiku Kansha~" (lit. Thank You For Everything!) also performed by Shugo Chara Egg!, and the second opening for Shugo Chara! Party! is "Going On!", also performed by Guardians 4. The second ending is "Our Songs" also performed by Buono!. Although Party was originally thought to be a non-canon to the original series, it was revealed later on that it is a continuation of the story after the conclusion of the manga.



Episode list

See also 
 List of Shugo Chara! episodes (01-51)
 List of Shugo Chara!! Doki episodes (52-102)

References

2009 Japanese television seasons
2010 Japanese television seasons
Party